Lchap is a village in the Gavar Municipality of the Gegharkunik Province of Armenia.

Etymology 
The village was known as Agzibir, Aghzibir, and Kiziljik until 1945.

References

External links 
 World Gazeteer: Armenia – World-Gazetteer.com
 
 
 

Populated places in Gegharkunik Province